14 Camelopardalis is a star in the northern circumpolar constellation of Camelopardalis, located 272 light years away from the Sun as determined by parallax measurements. With an apparent visual magnitude of 6.49, it is a challenge to view with the naked eye even in excellent viewing conditions. The heliocentric radial velocity value is poorly constrained, but it appears to be moving closer to the Earth at the rate of around −4 km/s.

This is a white-hued, A-type main-sequence star with a stellar classification of A7 Vn, where the 'n' notation indicates "nebulous" lines due to rapid rotation. The star is 504 million years old with 1.61 times the mass of the Sun and is spinning with a projected rotational velocity of 312 km/s. It is radiating 15 times the Sun's luminosity from its photosphere at an effective temperature of 7,872 K.

References

A-type main-sequence stars
Camelopardalis (constellation)
Durchmusterung objects
Camelopardalis, 14
033296
024348
1678